Elsmere is a home rule-class city in Kenton County, Kentucky, in the United States. The population was 8,451 at the 2010 census.

Geography
Elsmere is located in western Kenton County at  (39.001475, -84.603116). It is bordered to the north and east by Erlanger, to the south by Independence, and to the west by Florence in Boone County. The Dixie Highway (U.S. Routes 25, 42, and 127) forms the northern border of the city and leads northeast  to Covington and southwest  to the center of Florence.

History
The community was first settled in 1885 as "South Erlanger". Elsmere organized as a city in 1896, renamed after Elsmere Avenue in Norwood, Ohio, the hometown of one of its founders.

Government
In 1998, Billy Bradford was elected mayor of Elsmere, the first African-American mayor elected in northern Kentucky. He served 12 years (three terms), and now serves as a member of the city council. The current mayor is Marty Lenhof.

Economy
Regal Beloit (formerly Emerson Power Transmission) and L'Oréal have facilities in an unincorporated pocket of Kenton County surrounded by Elsmere. Portions of Elsmere have a Florence mailing address. Mazak's North American headquarters are in Elsmere.

Education

Portions of the cities of Elsmere and adjacent Erlanger share a public school system: Erlanger/Elsemere Independent School District.

The following schools are shared by the two cities:

Primary schools
Arnett Elementary School
Howell Elementary School
Lindeman Elementary School
Miles Elementary School
Tichenor Middle School

Secondary schools
Lloyd Memorial High School

A portion of Elsmere is in the Kenton County School District

Demographics

According to the 2010 U.S. census, there were 8,451 people, 2,992 households, and 2,131 families residing in the city. The racial makeup was 84.3 percent white, 7.1 percent black, 0.4% Native American, 0.4% Asian American, 0.2% Native Hawaiian or other Pacific Islander, 4.2% some other race, and 3.4% two or more races. 8.2% of the population were Hispanic or Latino of any race.

References

External links
 Official website
 Historical Texts and Images of Elsmere, Kentucky

Cities in Kentucky
Cities in Kenton County, Kentucky